"Young Love" is a song by Irish pop duo Jedward. It is the second single released from their third album, also titled Young Love. It was released as a digital download on 15 June 2012.

The song is written by Lars Halvor Jensen and Tim McEwan of Danish songwriting and production house Deekay and Los Angeles-based songwriter Jess Cates.

Background
The song was first previewed in April 2012 via the JedwardTV YouTube channel, with a 42-second excerpt of the song. On 11 June, the song was officially confirmed as a single with an international, digital-only release date of 15 June 2012. The cover art was also released on this date, showing a subdued black and white portrait of the twins with flat hair and wearing no shirts. The song had its debut on 12 June, when it was played on Alan Murphy's radio show The Social Network on Irish radio station Galway Bay FM.

Music video 

On 13 June, the music video was released, directed by John and Edward themselves. Filmed at the Olympia Theatre in Dublin, the video takes inspiration from U2's Dublin-based "Sometimes You Can't Make It on Your Own" video, and pays homage to the Backstreet Boys' video for "Shape of My Heart".

Track listing

Chart performance

Release history

References

2012 songs
Jedward songs
Songs written by Jess Cates
Songs written by Lars Halvor Jensen
Songs written by Tim McEwan